Jean-Louis Gampert (1884-1942) was a Swiss painter and illustrator.

Biography
Gampert was born 8 February 1884 in Geneva.

He learnt painting with Heinrich Knirr (de) in Munich and then learnt in the Paris atelier of Maurice Denis and Sérusier. He is known for engraving prints for La locandiera. He was a friend of Roger de La Fresnaye, and took care of him until his death. La Fresnaye made several portraits of Gampert, one of them in the collection of the Musée National d'Art Moderne in Paris. Gampert's work was influenced by La Fresnaye's monumental style stemming from synthetic cubism.

From 1925 till 1928 Emile Chambon worked with Gampert, assisting him in his atelier and with decorating the church of Corsier. From 1927, Gampert and Alexandre Cingria lead the École des Pâquis movement, which included artists such as Emilio-Maria Beretta, Albert Chavaz and Paul Monnier.

Jean-Louis Gampert died 7 August 1942 in Geneva.

Works

Paintings and drawings 
 Melon, 1924. Musée d'art et d'histoire, Geneva
 L'extase de sainte Thérèse. Fondation Emile Chambon, Geneva 
 Portrait de Mme Tronchin, 1924. Museum of Modern Art, Troyes
 Portrait de Jacques Chenevière (1886-1976), hommes de lettres genevois, 1924. Geneva Public Library
 Sketch for the costume of Olivia in "La Nuit des rois" by Shakespeare, 1914

Illustrations 
 Mesure pour mesure by William Shakespeare, traduction et préface de Guy de Pourtalès, Paris : Société littéraire de France Paris, 1921 (wood engravings)
 Théâtre de Clara Gazul by Prosper Mérimée, Paris, édition de la nouvelle revue française, 1922
 La Route aplanie by Marius Besson, 1931

Bibliography
 FERRARE, Henri, Jean-Louis Gampert, Neuchâtel, Edition de la Baconnière, 1937
 Jean-Louis Gampert, exhibition catalogue, Geneva, Palais de l'Athénée, October 1943 
 SCHURR, Gérald, 1820-1920. Les petits maîtres de la peinture, valeur de demain, Editions de l'amateur, 1979, p. 162
 OSTERWALDER, Marcus (sous la direction de), Dictionnaire des illustrateurs, 1890-1945, Éditions Ides et Calendes, 1992. p. 419
 CLERC, Philippe, Émile Chambon (1905-1993) la magie du réalisme, Somogy, Paris, 2011

Notes and references

Artists from Geneva
Swiss illustrators
20th-century Swiss painters
Swiss male painters
1884 births
1942 deaths
20th-century Swiss male artists